Lake Santee is an unincorporated town and census-designated place in Decatur and Franklin counties, Indiana, United States. As of the 2010 census, it had a population of 820.

History
Lake Santee was built up in the 1960s as a housing development centered on a reservoir of the same name.

Geography

The water area consists entirely of Lake Santee, the reservoir.

Demographics

References

Census-designated places in Franklin County, Indiana
Census-designated places in Decatur County, Indiana
Census-designated places in Indiana